Mary Germaine is an English film actress.

Filmography

References

External links
 

1933 births
English film actresses
People from Westcliff-on-Sea
Living people
Actresses from Essex
20th-century English actresses